The Washburn family is a family of politicians from the United States. Below is a list of members:

Israel Washburn (1718–1796), member of the Massachusetts Legislature 1780. Father of Israel Washburn II
Israel Washburn II (1755–1841), member of the Massachusetts Legislature 1804–810. Son of Israel Washburn
Israel Washburn (1784–1876), Massachusetts State Representative 1815–1816, 1818–1819. Son of Israel Washburn II.
Reuel Washburn (1793–1878), Maine State Senator 1827–1828, Probate Court Judge in Maine 1857–1859. Son of Israel Washburn II.
Israel Washburn, Jr. (1813–1883), Maine State Representative 1842, U.S. Representative from Maine 1851–1861, Governor of Maine 1861–1863. Son of Israel Washburn.
Elihu B. Washburne (1816–1887), U.S. Representative from Illinois 1853–1869, U.S. Secretary of State 1869, U.S. Minister to France 1869–1877, candidate for Republican nomination for President of the United States 1880, candidate for Republican nomination for Vice President of the United States 1880. Son of Israel Washburn.
Cadwallader C. Washburn (1818–1882), U.S. Representative from Wisconsin 1855–1861, 1867–1871, Governor of Wisconsin 1872–1874. Son of Israel Washburn.
Charles Ames Washburn (1822–1889), U.S. Diplomatic Commissioner to Paraguay 1861–1863, U.S. Minister to Paraguay 1863–1868. Son of Israel Washburn.
William D. Washburn (1831–1912), Minnesota State Representative 1861, U.S. Representative from Minnesota 1879–1885, U.S. Senator from Minnesota 1889–1895. Son of Israel Washburn.
Dorilus Morrison (1814–1897), Minnesota State Senator 1864–1865, Mayor of Minneapolis, Minnesota 1867–1868, 1869–1870. Cousin of William D. Washburn.
Ganem W. Washburn (1823–1907), Wisconsin State Senator 1859–1860; Wisconsin Circuit Court judge. Son of Reuel Washburn.
Hempstead Washburne (1851–1918), Attorney of Chicago, Illinois 1885–1889; Mayor of Chicago, Illinois 1891–1893. Son of Elihu Washburne.
William Drew Washburn, Jr. (1863–1929), member of the Minnesota Legislature 1901 1905 1909 1911 1917 1921 1923 1925. Son of William D. Washburn.
Stanley Washburn, delegate to the Republican National Convention 1912, candidate for U.S. Representative from New Jersey 1932. Son of William D. Washburn.

NOTE: Cadwallader C. Washburn was also fourth cousin once removed of U.S. Senator Charles Sumner.

See also
List of United States political families

References

 
Political families of the United States
Families from Illinois
Families from Maine
Families from Massachusetts
Families from Minnesota
Families from Wisconsin